Sea Breezes is a monthly magazine devoted to the worldwide shipping industry. Focusing on maritime news, including specialist coverage of naval, ferry, coastal, sail and cruise sectors, it also explores ships, ports, maritime events and places in depth, in regular feature articles.

History
Sea Breezes was first published in December 1919 as the house magazine of the Pacific Steam Navigation Company. The first editor was Thomas Edwin “Pardy” Edwards. It soon expanded its focus to include news about commercial shipping in general and featured many articles about historical ships and shipping in the age of sail. Ten issues were produced each year.

To reflect this change in focus the title was changed in 1937 or 1938 to Sea Breezes - The Ship Lovers' Magazine and the price increased from 3d to 6d per copy. It was at that time published by Charles Birchall and Sons, 17 James St, Liverpool. The magazine ceased production in October 1939 for the duration of World War II. Paper had become difficult to source and the editor, Lieut-Commander J. Francis Hall RNR was on active service with the British Navy.

Production of the publication began again in 1946. The title had again changed, and was now Sea Breezes - The Ship Lovers' Digest. In 1965, twelve issues were produced each year. The physical format of the journal underwent various changes. The first color photograph was used on the cover in August 1973.

Present day
The publication continues to be produced by a team based in the Isle of Man. More than 1000 issues of the journal have been published. By 2019 it had a readership of over 65,000.

References

External links 
 Sea Breezes website
 History of Sea Breezes

Business magazines published in the United Kingdom
Companies of the Isle of Man
Magazines established in 1919
Maritime magazines
Monthly magazines published in the United Kingdom
Maritime history magazines